This article presents a complete list of compositions by Greek composer Iannis Xenakis (1922-2001), organized by instrumentation. Within each category, the works are arranged chronologically by year of composition.

Orchestral works

Vocal
 Anastenaria: Procession aux eaux claires, for SATB chorus of 30 voices, male choir of 15 voices, and orchestra (1953)
 Polla ta dhina, for children's choir and orchestra (1962)
 Cendrées, for chorus and orchestra (1973–74)
 Anémoessa, for SATB chorus of 42 or 84 voices and orchestra (1979)
 Aïs, for amplified baritone, percussion and orchestra (1980)
 Nekuïa, for SATB chorus of 54 or 80 voices and orchestra (1981)

Stage
 Kraanerg, ballet for orchestra and tape (1968)
 Antikhthon, ballet for orchestra (1971)

Other orchestral
 Anastenaria: Le sacrifice (1953)
 Metastaseis (1953–54, also known as MetastaseisB)
 Pithoprakta (1955–56)
 Achorripsis, for an orchestra of 21 instruments  (1956–57)
 Duel, for 2 small orchestras (1959)
 Syrmos, for string orchestra (1959)
 Stratégie for 2 orchestras (1959–62)
 ST/48, 1-240162 (1959–62)
 Hiketides (les suppliantes d'Eschyle), for brass quartet & 24 strings (1964)
 Akrata, for wind orchestra (1964–65)
 Terretektorh (1966)
 Polytope [de Montréal], for 4 orchestras (1967)
 Nomos gamma (1967–8)
 Synaphaï, for piano and orchestra (1969)
 Eridanos, (1972)
 Erikhthon, for piano and orchestra  (1974)
 Noomena (1974)
 Empreintes (1975)
 Jonchaies (1977)
 Pour les baleines, for string orchestra (1982)
 Lichens (1983)
 Shaar (1983)
 Alax, for three ensembles of 10 instruments each (1985)
 Horos (1986)
 Keqrops, for piano and orchestra (1986)
 Ata (1987)
 Tracées (1987)
 Kyania (1990)
 Tuorakemsu (1990)
 Dox-Orkh, for violin and orchestra (1991)
 Krinoïdi (1991)
 Roáï (1991)
 Troorkh, for trombone and orchestra (1991)
 Mosaïques (1993)
 Dämmerschein (1993–94)
 Koïranoï (1994)
 Ioolkos (1995)
 Voile, for string orchestra (1995)
 Sea-Change (1997)
 O-Mega, for percussion soloist and chamber orchestra (1997)

Vocal works

Choral
 Zyia, for soprano soloist, male chorus, flute and piano (1952, also exists in a version for soprano soloist, flute and piano)
 Oresteia, for chorus and 12 instruments (1965–66)
 Medea senecae, for male voices and 6 instruments (1967)
 Nuits, for SATB chorus of 12 voices (1967–68)
 À Colone, for male or female voices and 3 instruments (1977)
 À Hélène, for female voices (1977)
 Pour la Paix, for SATB chorus, two male speakers, two female speakers, and tape (1981)
 Serment-Orkos, for SATB chorus of 32 or more voices (1981)
 Chant des Soleils, for SATB chorus, children's choir, brass ensemble and percussion (1983)
 Idmen A/Idmen B, for SATB chorus of 64 or more voices and percussion (1985)
 Knephas, for SATB chorus of 32 or more voices (1990)
 Pu wijnuej we fyp, for children's choir (1992)
 Les Bacchantes, for baritone soloist, female voices and 9 instruments (1993)
 Sea–Nymphs, for SATB chorus of 24 or more voices  (1994)

Other vocal
 N'shima, for two mezzo-soprano or alto soloists, 2 horns, 2 trombones and cello (1975)
 Akanthos, for soprano, flute, clarinet, piano, 2 violins, viola, cello and double bass (1977)
 Pour Maurice, for baritone and piano (1982)
 Kassandra, for baritone/psalterion and percussion (1987, an additional movement for Oresteïa)
 La déesse Athéna, for baritone soloist, piccolo, oboe, E-flat clarinet, doublebass clarinet, contrabassoon, horn, piccolo trumpet, trombone, tuba, percussion and cello (1992, an additional movement for Oresteïa)

Chamber music

With piano
 Eonta, for 2 trumpets, 3 trombones and piano (1963–64)
 Palimpsest, for English horn, bass clarinet, bassoon, horn, percussion, piano and string quintet (1979)
 Dikhthas, for violin and piano (1979)
 Thalleïn, for piccolo, oboe, clarinet, bassoon, horn, piccolo trumpet, trombone, percussion, piano and string quintet (1984)
 Akea, for piano and string quartet (1986)
 Paille in the Wind, for cello and piano (1992)
 Plektó, for flute, clarinet, percussion, piano, violin and cello (1993)

For string ensemble
 ST/4, 1-080262, for string quartet (1956–62, transcription of ST/48, 1-240162)
 Analogique A, for string ensemble (1958, must be performed with tape work Analogique B)
 Aroura, for string ensemble of 12 players (1971)
 Retours-Windungen, for 12 cellos (1976)
 Ikhoor, for string trio (1978)
 Tetras, for string quartet (1983)
 Tetora, for string quartet (1990)
 Ergma, for string quartet (1994)
 Hunem-Iduhey, for violin and cello (1996)
 Ittidra, for string sextet (1996)
 Roscobeck, for cello and double bass (1996)

For percussion ensemble
 Persephassa, for 6 percussionists (1969)
 Pléïades, for 6 percussionists (1978)
 Okho, for 3 djembés and bass-drum (1989)

Other chamber
 ST/10, 1-080262, for clarinet, bass clarinet, 2 horns, harp, percussion and string quartet (1956–62)
 Morsima-Amorsima, for piano, violin, cello and double bass (1962)
 Atrées, for flute, clarinet, bass clarinet, horn, trumpet, trombone, 2 percussionists, violin and cello (1962)
 Anaktoria, for clarinet, bassoon, horn, string quartet and double bass (1969)
 Charisma, for clarinet and cello (1971)
 Linaia-Agon, for horn, trombone and tuba (1972)
 Phlegra, for flute, oboe, clarinet, bassoon, horn, trumpet, trombone, violin, viola, cello and double bass (1975)
 Epeï, for English horn, clarinet, trumpet, 2 trombones and double bass (1976)
 Dmaathen, for oboe and percussion (1976)
 Komboï, for amplified harpsichord and percussion (1981)
 Khal Perr, for brass quintet and 2 percussionists (1983)
 Nyûyô, for shakuhachi, sangen and 2 koto (1985)
 À l'île de Gorée, for amplified harpsichord, piccolo, oboe, clarinet, bassoon, horn, trumpet and string quintet (1986)
 Jalons, for piccolo, oboe, bass clarinet, doublebass clarinet, contrabassoon, horn, trumpet, trombone, tuba, harp, string quintet (1987)
 XAS, for saxophone quartet (1987)
 Waarg, for piccolo, oboe, clarinet, bassoon, horn, trumpet, trombone, tuba and string quintet (1988)
 Échange, for solo bass clarinet, flute, oboe, clarinet, bassoon, horn, trumpet, trombone, tuba and string quintet (1989)
 Epicycles, for solo cello, flute, oboe, clarinet, horn, trumpet, trombone, tuba, 2 violins, viola and double bass (1989)
 Oophaa, for harpsichord and percussion (1989)
 Mnamas xapin Witoldowi Lutoslavskiemu, for 2 horns and 2 trumpets (1994)
 Kaï, for flute, clarinet, bassoon, trumpet, trombone, violin, viola, cello and double bass (1995)
 Kuïlenn, for flute, 2 oboes, 2 clarinets, 2 bassoons and 2 horns (1995)
 Zythos, for trombone and six percussionists (1996)

Solo instrumental

For piano
 Six Chansons pour piano (1950)
 Herma, for piano (1961)
 Evryali, for piano  (1973)
 Mists, for piano (1981)
 À r. (Hommage à Ravel), for piano (1987)

For string instrument
 Nomos Alpha, for cello (1965–66)
 Mikka, for violin (1971)
 Theraps, for double bass (1975–76)
 Mikka 'S''', for violin (1976)
 Kottos, for cello (1977)
 Embellie, for viola (1981)

Other solo instrumental
 Gmeeoorh, for organ (1974), commissioned by and for the 1974 International Contemporary Organ Music Festival at the Hartt School of Music, premiered by Clyde Holloway.
 Psappha, for percussion (1975)
 Khoaï, for harpsichord (1976)
 Naama, for amplified harpsichord (1984)
 Keren, for trombone (1986)
 Rebonds, for percussion (1988)

Tape
 Diamorphoses, 2-track (1957–58)
 Concret PH, 2-track (1958)
 Analogique B, 2-track (1958–59, to be performed with the chamber work Analogique A)
 Orient-Occident, 2-track (1960, film score)
 The Thessaloniki World Fair, 1-track (1961)
 Bohor, 8-track (1962)
 Hibiki-Hana-Ma, 12-track (Polytope of Osaka, 1969–70)
 Persépolis, 8-track (Polytope of Persepolis, 1971)
 Polytope de Cluny, 8-track (1972)
 Polytope II (1974)
 La légende d'Eer (Diatope), 4- or 8-track (1977)

Created using UPIC
 Mycenae alpha, 2-track (Polytope of Mycenae, 1978)
 Taurhiphanie, 2-track (1987)
 Voyage absolu des Unari vers Andromède, 2-track (1989)

Created using dynamic stochastic synthesis
 GENDY3, 2-track (1991)
 S.709, 2-track (1994)

Unpublished or withdrawn
This section lists early pieces by Xenakis that have not been published during his lifetime, and works that were withdrawn from the catalogue by the composer himself, for various reasons. 
 Untitled piece for piano (February 1949, revised in June)
 Untitled piece for piano (March 1949)
 Untitled piece for piano (27 May 1949)
 Untitled piece for piano (October 1949)
 Menuet, for piano
 Air populaire, for piano
 Allegro molto, for piano
 Untitled piece for piano (January 1950)
 Mélodie, for piano
 Untitled piece for piano (April 1950)
 Untitled piece for piano (15 June 1950)
 Andante, for piano
 Thème et conséquences, for piano (1951, unpublished)
 Dhipli zyia, for violin and cello (1951, unpublished)
 Tripli zyia, for flute, voice and piano (1952, unpublished)
 Trois poèmes, for voice and piano (1952, unpublished)
 La colombe de la paix, for alto soloist and SATB chorus (1953, unpublished)
 Stamatis Katotakis, for soloist and male voices (1953, unpublished)
 Vasarely, tape (1960, film score, withdrawn)
 Formes rouges, tape (1961, film score, withdrawn)
 Amorsima-Morsima (1956–62, withdrawn)
 GENDY301, tape (1991, withdrawn)
 Erod, tape (1997, withdrawn, created using UPIC in collaboration with Brigitte Robindoré)

References

 
 Mâche, François-Bernard. 2000. L'hellénisme de Xenakis, in Un demi-siècle de musique … et toujours contemporaine''. Paris, l'Harmattan, pp. 302–321.

External links
 A complete list of works, organized chronologically, with score samples

Xenakis, Iannis